Dongqu Subdistrict, also known as East Subdistrict, or Eastern Subdistrict, is a subdistrict of Zhongshan City, Guangdong, China, which was established in 1987. It is the location of the Zhongshan Municipal Government, and is the political, economic, and cultural centre the city, and is renowned for being the (ancestral) hometown of 32,000 overseas Chinese. Officially, it is a subdistrict.

References

External links

Official website of East District, Zhongshan

Populated places established in 1987
Zhongshan
1987 establishments in China
Township-level divisions of Guangdong